Events from the year 1326 in Ireland.

Incumbent
Lord: Edward II

Deaths
 Richard Óg de Burgh, 2nd Earl of Ulster

 
1320s in Ireland
Ireland
Years of the 14th century in Ireland